Balwyn is a suburb of Melbourne, Victoria, Australia, 10 km east of Melbourne's Central Business District, located within the City of Boroondara local government area. Balwyn recorded a population of 13,495 at the 2021 census.

Whitehorse Road runs east–west along the ridgeline through the centre of Balwyn. Balwyn Road runs north–south from Koonung Creek Reserve (adjacent to the Eastern Freeway) to Canterbury Road.

The south western part of Balwyn was excised as the city of Deepdene in 2010. Balwyn is one of Victoria's most exclusive and affluent suburbs, regularly ranking in the state's top 10 most expensive suburbs.

History
The formally recognised traditional owners for the area in which Balwyn is located are the Wurundjeri People, who lived on the land for at least 14,000 years. The Wurundjeri People are represented by the Wurundjeri Woi Wurrung Cultural Heritage Aboriginal Corporation.

In the late 1850s Andrew Murray, commercial editor and political writer for The Argus newspaper, bought land on the hill overlooking Canterbury Gardens. He named his house Balwyn from the Gaelic bal and the Saxon wyn, meaning 'the home of the vine'. Balwyn Road and the district were named after it. The house was located on the site that is now part of Fintona Girls' School.

In 1868 Balwyn Primary School was opened in Balwyn Road about 100 metres north of Whitehorse Road. It was moved to its present site, south of Whitehorse Road, in 1880, opposite Murray's property. Balwyn's first town centre was near the intersection of Balwyn and Whitehorse Roads, containing a few shops, a blacksmith and the athenaeum or mechanics' institute. Anglican services began in 1868 and the St. Barnabas church, Balwyn Road, was opened in 1872.

Balwyn Post Office first opened on 26 August 1874, in a rural area, closed in 1894, then reopened in 1920. It faced a second closure on 11 February 2011 but due to a campaign by local residents and the intervention of the Federal Member, Josh Frydenberg, the service was reopened.

The Outer Circle railway line, with a station at Deepdene, opened in 1891, was closed in 1893, re-opened in 1900 then finally closed to passenger traffic in 1927.

The electric tram system was extended along Cotham Road to terminate at Burke Road, Deepdene, on 30 May 1913. The line was extended along Whitehorse Road, through Balwyn to terminate at Union Road, Mont Albert, on 30 September 1916.

The Balwyn Cinema, currently operated by Palace Cinemas, first opened as a single screen theatre in 1930. It was later converted into a 5-screen multiplex in the 1990s, but the foyer was restored in 2010, uncovering the original 1930s tiled floor. Until 2016 it also served as the head office of Palace Cinemas. The cinema's second major restoration in less than a decade saw the former office space converted into 6 extra screens, bringing the total number to 11.

A considerable number of local churches, such as the Deepdene Methodist Church, were constructed during the post-World War II boom of suburban development in the area.

Balwyn's status as an affluent suburb has seen middle to upper-middle-class families from suburbs such as Kew and Brighton transfer to the area to take advantage of the suburb's relatively large block sizes and proximity to some of Victoria's best private schools including those in the neighbouring suburbs of Canterbury and Kew. Some of the initial development of the suburb occurred along the Whitehorse Road tramline, along which the Wade handbag and the Jarvis Walker fishing rod factories were once located. The suburb's main shopping area is located around the intersection of Whitehorse Road and Balwyn Road.

Today

Balwyn is consistently ranked as one of Melbourne's 5 most exclusive suburbs. The heritage-protected Reid Estate is especially noted as an area of Balwyn between Mont Albert Road and Whitehorse Road containing many architecturally significant Interwar mansions. Balwyn is also home to the Maranoa Gardens, Australia's first botanical garden dedicated to indigenous flora. The suburb has been immortalised by the Skyhooks single named after the suburb, 'Balwyn Calling', while The Age newspaper once described the suburb as "arguably Melbourne's most loved".
In the 12-month period to January 2020 Balwyn reported a median house price of A$1.6 million for a three bedroom house.

Sport

The suburb has an Australian Rules football team, Balwyn, Greythorn Jets, competing in the Eastern Football League. It also has a cricket team the Balwyn Cricket Club.

Transport
The 109 tram line runs from Port Melbourne to Box Hill via Whitehorse Road. Several bus routes also service the area:

Bus
 200 – City (Queen St) – Bulleen, Victoria via Kew Junction
 207 – City (Queen St) – Doncaster Shoppington via Kew Junction
 284 – Doncaster Park and Ride – Box Hill via Greythorn Road
 285 – Doncaster Park and Ride – Camberwell via Balwyn Road
 302 – City (Lonsdale St) – Box Hill via Belmore Road and Eastern Freeway
 304 – City (Lonsdale St) – Doncaster Shoppington via Belmore Road and Eastern Freeway
 548 – Kew (Cotham Road) – La Trobe University Bundoora

Notable residents
 Warwick Capper – former Australian Rules footballer, singer, actor and media personality.
 Olivia Deeble – Home And Away actress
 Steve Hooker – world-famous pole vaulter, grew up in Balwyn.
 Kathy Jackson – national secretary of the Health Services Union
 Jane Kennedy – semi-regular panellist on television chat show The Circle.
 Belle Bruce Reid – Australia's first female veterinarian, established the Balwyn Veterinary Surgery.
 Tony Wilson – Melbourne-based Australian radio and television personality, writer and speaker
 Gary Young – drummer of Daddy Cool, lived in Balwyn.
 Luke Salerno - The best looking person in Balwyn North grot
 Megan Papalia 
 Hayden Ngo - Lives in Sydney

See also
 City of Camberwell – Balwyn was previously within this former local government area.
 Bonjour Balwyn – A 1971 Australian independent film.
 Electoral district of Balwyn – An electoral district of the Victorian Legislative Assembly (1955–1992).

References

External links

Australian Places – Balwyn & Balwyn North

Suburbs of Melbourne
Suburbs of the City of Boroondara